Freestyle may refer to:

Brands
 Reebok Freestyle, a women's athletic shoe
 Ford Freestyle, an SUV automobile
 Coca-Cola Freestyle, a vending machine
 ICD Freestyle, a paintball marker
 Abbott FreeStyle, a blood glucose monitor by Abbott Laboritories

Media
 FreeStyle, a television show on HGTV
 Free Style (film), a 2009 American film
 Freestyle (radio program), a radio program on CBC's Radio One
 FreeStyleGames, a UK video game developer
 Freestyle Releasing, an independent film studio
 Freestyle (software), a renderer for non-photorealistic line drawing from 3D scenes
 Freestyle: The Art of Rhyme, a 2000 documentary film about freestyle rap

Music
 Freestyle music
 Freestyle rap

Performers and groups
 Freestyle (rapper), a member of Arsonists
 Freestyle (Swedish band), a short-lived Swedish electronic band
 Freestyle (Filipino band), an alternative-soul jazz-RnB band from the Philippines
 Freestyle (Russian group), a Soviet group with frontman Vadim Kazachenko
 Freestylers, a British electronic music group

Songs
 "Freestyler" (song), by Bomfunk MC's
 "Freestyle", by P.O.D. from The Fundamental Elements of Southtown
 "Freestyle" (Lady Antebellum song), 2014
 "Freestyle", by Kanye West from the 2016 album The Life of Pablo
 "Freestyle" (Lil Baby song), 2017
 "Freestyle" (Rod Wave song), 2020
 "Freestyle", by DJ Kay Slay from the 2003 album The Streetsweeper, Vol. 1

Sports
 Freestyle aerobics
 Freestyle BMX
 Freestyle chess
 Freestyle dressage
 Freestyle fighting
 Freestyle footbag
 Freestyle football
 Freestyle frisbee
 Freestyle kayaking
 Freestyle (monster trucks)
 Freestyle motocross
 Freestyle nunchaku
 Freestyle scootering
 Freestyle skateboarding
 Freestyle skiing
 Freestyle skydiving
 Freestyle slalom skating
 Freestyle snowboarding
 Freestyle swimming
 Freestyle wrestling
 Musical canine freestyle

Other
 Freestyle (art exhibition)
 Freestyle dance
 Freestyle (roller coaster)
 Freestyle Music Park, South Carolina, US
 Skyjam ST-Freestyle, a Swiss powered paraglider
 ICD Freestyle, a paintball marker
 Freestyle, NATO reporting name for the Yakovlev Yak-141, a Soviet VTOL aircraft